Szabat is a surname. Notable people with the surname include:

 Joel Szabat (fl. from 2005), American government official
 Przemysław Szabat (born 1985), Polish footballer

See also
 Sabbat (disambiguation)
 Shabat, a name